Phaegoptera is a genus of moths in the family Erebidae. The genus was proposed by Gottlieb August Wilhelm Herrich-Schäffer in 1853.

Species

Phaegoptera albescens Travassos, 1955
Phaegoptera albimacula (E. D. Jones, 1908)
Phaegoptera alipioi Travassos, 1955
Phaegoptera chorima Schaus, 1896
Phaegoptera decrepida (Herrich-Schäffer, [1855])
Phaegoptera decrepidoides (Rothschild, 1909)
Phaegoptera depicta (Herrich-Schäffer, [1855])
Phaegoptera discisema (Hampson, 1916)
Phaegoptera fasciatus (Rothschild, 1909)
Phaegoptera flavopunctata (Herrich-Schäffer, [1855])
Phaegoptera flavostrigata (Herrich-Schäffer, [1855])
Phaegoptera fusca Travassos, 1955
Phaegoptera granifera Schaus, 1892
Phaegoptera hampsoni (Rothschild, 1909)
Phaegoptera histrionica Herrich-Schäffer, [1853]
Phaegoptera irregularis (Rothschild, 1916)
Phaegoptera medionigra (Reich, 1934)
Phaegoptera nexa (Herrich-Schäffer, [1855])
Phaegoptera ochracea Joicey & Talbot, 1918
Phaegoptera pseudocatenata Travassos, 1955
Phaegoptera pulchra Travassos, 1955
Phaegoptera punctularis (Herrich-Schäffer, [1855])
Phaegoptera schaefferi (Schaus, 1892)
Phaegoptera sestia (Druce, 1906)

Former species
Phaegoptera picturata (Burmeister, 1878)
Phaegoptera superba (Druce, 1911)

References

 
Phaegopterina
Moth genera